Laplander may refer to:
 Something from or related to Lapland (region)
 Sami people, or anyone else living in the area of Lapland
 Laplander, also used in English contexts for the Finnish speaking population in Finnish Lapland
 Volvo Laplander L3314, a type of military vehicle produced by Volvo
 LAPLander (Light Airbag Protected Lander), a space probe